Arpa Ke'un, also known as Arpa Khan or Gavon or Gawon (died 1336), was an Ilkhan (1335–1336) during the disintegration of the Ilkhanate, Mongol state in Southwest Asia based in Persia.

Life 
Not much is known on Arpa's earlier life, except that he was a member of the house of Tolui. His lineage traced back to Ariq Böke, who was the youngest brother of Möngke, Kublai and Hulagu.His grandfather Mingqan Ke'un was a son of Malik Temür and Emegen Khatun and arrived in Iran during reign of Öljaitü in summer of 1306.

Reign 
He was nominated to the throne by Abu Sa'id's vizier Ghiyas al-Din and was elected 5 days later with regnal title Sultan Muiz al-Dunya wa'l Din Mahmud on Karabakh. Instead of a golden crown, he had a felt and simple waistband as regaila. Almost immediately he had to deal with an invasion by Özbeg of the Golden Horde. He defeated the invasion, and furthermore used it as a pretext for executing Abu Sa'id's widow Bagdad Katun, accusing her of poisoning Abu Sa'id and allying with Özbeg He afterwards married Sati Beg, Abu Sa'id's sister and widow of Chupan in order to legitimize his rule. Another execution was of Mahmudshah Inju, former ruler of Fars province in March 1336 (he was imprisoned by Abu Sa'id earlier because of his attempt on ilkhan's life). He also gave Shaykh Hasan the overall command of armies.

He was characterized as not a practicing Muslim and more in favor of Genghis Khan's Yasa, mostly ignoring laws of Muslim khans like Ghazan and Abu Sa'id. His rule was not accepted by a part of Oirats, whose leader and the governor of Baghdad - Ali Padshah was an uncle of Abu Sa'id and had his own designs on throne. Claiming Abu Sa'id's wife Dilshad Khatun was still pregnant, he raised Musa, the grandson of Baydu as rightful heir to the throne. Oirat traditional rivalry with Ariq Böke's line could also be a factor in this rebellion.

After securing Shaykh Hasan's neutrality, Ali Padshah went on to battle Arpa on Jaghatu plains near Maraga on 29 April 1336. Arpa's army were led by 60 emirs, notably Hajji Taghay (son of Sutay, Governor of Diyar Bakr), Uyghur commander Ögrünch, Torut (a son of Nari and relative of Narin Taghay), Ortuq-Shah (son of Alghu) and Chupan's son Sorgan Sira. However, soon some emirs defected to the side of Ali Padshah, such as Mahmud b. Essen Qutlugh and Sultanshah Nikruz. The battle was a defeat for Arpa and soon after he was captured in Sultaniya and killed on 15 May 1336 by Mahmudshah's son, Amir Jalal al-Din Mas'ud Shah.

Ancestry

References

1336 deaths
Il-Khan emperors
14th-century monarchs in Asia
Year of birth unknown
Executed monarchs